The women's 4 x 400 metres relay event at the 2011 Summer Universiade was held on 21 August.

Results

References
Results

Relay
2011